Joe or JOE may refer to:

Arts

Film and television
 Joe (1970 film), starring Peter Boyle
 Joe (2013 film), starring Nicolas Cage
 Joe (TV series), a British TV series airing from 1966 to 1971
 Joe, a 2002 Canadian animated short about Joe Fortes

Music and radio
 "Joe" (Inspiral Carpets song)
 "Joe" (Red Hot Chili Peppers song) 
 "Joe", a song by The Cranberries on their album To the Faithful Departed 
"Joe", a song by PJ Harvey on her album Dry
"Joe", a song by AJR on their album OK Orchestra
 Joe FM (disambiguation), any of several radio stations

Computing
 Joe's Own Editor, a text editor for Unix systems
 Joe, an object-oriented Java computing framework based on Sun's Distributed Objects Everywhere project

Media
 Joe (website), a news website for the UK and Ireland
 Joe (magazine), a defunct periodical developed originally for Kenyan youth

Places
 Joe, North Carolina, United States, an unincorporated community
 Jõe, Saaremaa Parish, Estonia, a village
 Kaarma-Jõe, Estonia, a village
 Joe Island (Victoria), Australia
 Joe Island (Greenland)

People
 Joe (given name), a given name (including a list of people and fictional characters with the name)
 Isaiah Joe (born 1999), American basketball player
 Joe (singer) (born 1973 as Joe Lewis Thomas), American singer, songwriter and record producer
 J.O.E., stage name of Alty George Nunes III (1986–2011), a Jamaican reggae singer

Other uses
 Jōe, a garment worn in Japanese religious ceremonies
 Joe (drink), slang for coffee
 Joe, a currency, see banknotes of Demerary and Essequibo
 Joensuu Airport,  Liperi, Finland, by IATA airport code

See also

Joe 1, American codename for the first Soviet nuclear weapon test 
Joe 4, American codename for the first Soviet test of a thermonuclear weapon
Joes (disambiguation)
Joey (disambiguation)
Jo (disambiguation)